Schurr is a surname. Notable people with the surname include:

Christian Schurr Voight (born 1984), Mexican swimmer
Wayne Schurr (born 1937), American baseball player
Claude Schürr, French painter
Gérald Schürr, French art critic
Théophile Schürr, French soldier

See also
Schurr High School, high school in California, United States